Allievi is a surname. Notable people with the surname include:

Lorenzo Allievi (1856–1941), Italian engineer
Nicholas Allievi (born 1992), Italian footballer
Sergio Allievi (born 1964),  German footballer
Vittorio Allievi (born 1962), Italian gymnast
Walter Allievi (born 1960), Italian footballer